= Dobra Jagir =

- village
- Location within Madhya Pradesh Location within India
- Coordinates: 23.2428916°N 77.531488°E
- Country: India
- State: Madhya Pradesh
- District: Bhopal
- Tehsil: Huzur
- Elevation: 456 m (1,496 ft)

Population (2011)
  - Total: 289
- Time zone: UTC+5:30 (IST)
- 2011 census code: 482436

Dobra Jagir is a village in the Bhopal district of Madhya Pradesh, India. It is located in the Huzur tehsil and the Phanda block.

== Demographics ==
According to the 2011 census of India, Dobra Jagir has 56 households. The effective literacy rate (i.e. the literacy rate of population excluding children aged 6 and below) is 80.89%.

Demographics (2011 Census)
| | Total | Male | Female |
|---|---|---|---|
| Population | 289 | 155 | 134 |
| Children aged below 6 years | 43 | 26 | 17 |
| Scheduled caste | 22 | 12 | 10 |
| Scheduled tribe | 9 | 5 | 4 |
| Literates | 199 | 118 | 81 |
| Workers (all) | 108 | 93 | 15 |
| Main workers (total) | 106 | 91 | 15 |
| Main workers: Cultivators | 40 | 35 | 5 |
| Main workers: Agricultural labourers | 30 | 24 | 6 |
| Main workers: Household industry workers | 0 | 0 | 0 |
| Main workers: Other | 36 | 32 | 4 |
| Marginal workers (total) | 2 | 2 | 0 |
| Marginal workers: Cultivators | 1 | 1 | 0 |
| Marginal workers: Agricultural labourers | 1 | 1 | 0 |
| Marginal workers: Household industry workers | 0 | 0 | 0 |
| Marginal workers: Others | 0 | 0 | 0 |
| Non-workers | 181 | 62 | 119 |
